The tripodfish or tripod spiderfish, Bathypterois grallator, is a deep-sea benthic fish in the family Ipnopidae found at lower latitudes. It is now relatively well known from photographs and submersible observations, and seems to prefer to perch on the ooze using much elongated fin rays in the tail and two pelvic fins to stand, facing upstream with the pectoral fins turned forward so the outthrust projecting fin rays resemble multiple antennae, and are indeed used as tactile organs. B. grallator is hermaphroditic. At least 18 species are placed in the genus Bathypterois, several of which have similar appearance and behavior to B. grallator.

Characteristics
The tripodfish, also known as the tripe, has long, bony rays that stick out below its tail fin and both pelvic fins. Most of the time, the tripodfish stands on its three fins on the bottom of the ocean, hunting for food. Even though the fins are presumably quite stiff, researchers have been successful in surprising the fish into swimming, and then the fins seem flexible. Scientists have suggested that fluids are pumped into these fins when the fish is 'standing' to make them more rigid.

Habitat

Food
The tripodfish uses tactile and mechanosensory cues to identify food; it apparently does not have special visual adaptations to help it find food in the low-light environment. When the fish is perched with its long rays on the ocean floor, it can get food without even seeing it. The tripodfish's mouth ends up at just the right height to catch shrimp, tiny fish, and small crustaceans swimming by. They seem to prefer to perch on the mud using much elongated fin rays in their tails and two pelvic fins to stand, facing upstream into the current to ambush with the pectoral fins turned forward so  the outthrust projecting fins resemble multiple antennae. The fish senses objects in the water with its front fins.  These fins act like hands.  Once they feel prey and realize it is edible, the fins knock the food into the fish's mouth.  The fish faces into the current, waiting for prey to drift by.

Reproduction
Each individual has male and female reproductive organs.  If two tripodfish happen to meet, they mate.  However, if a tripodfish does not find a partner, it makes both sperm and eggs to produce offspring by itself.

Related and similar species
At least 18 species included in the genus Bathypterois.  Similar species are often observed in the same areas.  A 2001 report included observations of Bathypterois dubius as far as 50°N in the Bay of Biscay.

A striking parallel exists between some icefishes and the tripodfishes.  The stance of Chionodraco is an even more striking parallel. Both icefishes and the tripodfish use a similar strategy of sitting motionless above the substrate with the attendant benefits that motionlessness brings to a nonvisual, particularly mechanosensory, function.

The tripodfish is closely related to the spider fish Bathypterois longifilis, which is similar in appearances and habits but is smaller and has much shorter fin extensions. They are often found standing very close to each other.  The family to which both fish belong, Inopidae, is called the family of tripod fishes or spiderfishes interchangeably.

References

External links
 Australian Museum page on Tripodfish
Video showing a tripodfish at 1443m depth

Ipnopidae
Fish described in 1886